Leó von Baráth (born 9 June 1891, date of death unknown) was a Hungarian tennis player. He competed in two events at the 1912 Summer Olympics.

References

1891 births
Year of death missing
Hungarian male tennis players
Olympic tennis players of Hungary
Tennis players at the 1912 Summer Olympics
Tennis players from Budapest